Atanasije Ljubojević or Ljubović (c. 1635 - 1712) was the Serbian Orthodox Metropolitan of Dabar-Bosnia from 1681, and then the bishop of the Orthodox Serbs in the Venetian areas in the Dalmatian hinterland and the Habsburg areas in Gornja Krajina.
He is recorded in history as the only diocesan archbishop from the time of the renewed Serbian Patriarchate (1557-1766) who performed the diocesan service under Turkish, Venetian and Habsburg rule.

Serbian bishop in Bosnia under the Turks
Ljubojević comes from Sarajevo, where he was born. After the death of the Metropolitan of Dabro-Bosnia, Hristofor Pivljanin (1681), the Serbian Patriarch Arsenije III appointed Atanasije Ljubojević as the new Metropolitan of Dabro-Bosnia, based in the ancient Dabar Monastery of St. Nicholas in Banja na Lim. The Metropolitan's position had to be made by the state authorities through a berrat (an official acquittal) of the Turkish Sultan Mehmed IV (1682). During the first years of his service, the metropolitan managed the entire area of the Eparchy of Dabro-Bosnia, which stretched from lower Polimlje, through the central Bosnian areas, to Cetina, Bukovica, Lika, Krbava, Pounje and Zrinopolje in the far west of the diocesan area.  He regularly visited the parish in Sarajevo. He sent letters and epistles to the dioceses in which he pointed out the need to keep the Orthodox faith awake.

Turkish violence against Orthodox Christians and church institutions in the area of Polimlje during the Vienna War (1683-1699) led the Metropolitan to leave the cathedral monastery of Banja (1688). Together with his relatives and a part of the monastics from the Beaver monasteries, he moved to the western areas of the Diocese of Dabro-Bosnia, which fell under Venetian and Habsburg rule during the war years. In these areas, he continued to perform the service of the diocesan archbishop. He remained loyal to Patriarch Arsenije III since he received transcripts of the first privileges, given to the Serbian people in 1690 and 1691 by Emperor Leopold I.

Serbian bishop in Venetian Dalmatia
During the first years after leaving Turkish Bosnia, the focus of the metropolitan's service was on the territory of Venetian Dalmatia.  
Upon his arrival in the Dalmatian hinterland, he arranged the bishop's residence at the church of St. Nicholas in the Atlagić Tower. He appeared before the Venetian authorities in Dalmatia, calling for Serbian privileges (1692). He enjoyed the support of the Orthodox clergy and national leaders, who (1693), led by Serdar Zaviš Janković, took up the task of making the metropolitan's position before the Venetian authorities official. Since they did not want to allow the Venetian state government to formalize the metropolitan's position, Roman Catholic bishops and other opponents of the Serbian hierarchy and Orthodox faith used the metropolitan's occasional visits to the neighbouring Habsburg area of Lika and Krbava to accuse him of participating in the emigration. At the instigation of the then nuncio in Venice and his associates in Dalmatia, the Venetian authorities took a hostile attitude towards the metropolitan, who then had to move to the neighbouring Habsburg areas.

Serbian bishop in the Habsburg Krajina
After moving to the area of Lika and Krbava, he started (1695) arranging a new archbishop's residence in the Lika village of Metka. He also visited Orthodox Serbs in the area of Zrinopolje, where the Komogovina monastery was founded. On the basis of Serbian privileges and earlier affiliation of that area to the Kingdom of Slavonia, he received from Ban Adam Baćanji (1696) confirmation of religious eldership over the Orthodox people and clergy in the area of new regions between the rivers Kupa and Una. He also met with the Serbian patriarch Arsenije (1698), to whom he remained permanently attached.

During the war and post-war years, he managed to preserve the diocesan order in the areas of Zrinopolje, Lika and Krbava, which led Serbian Patriarch Arsenije III Čarnojević to extend the diocesan jurisdiction of Bishop Atanasij to the pre-war area of the Karlovac General. This completed the creation of a single diocese in the area of Upper Krajina. The new diocese included the Karlovac Generalate with Lika and Krbava and the new region between Kupa and Una, with three main spiritual centers in the monasteries of Komogovina, Gomirje and Metka.

Opponents of the Serbian hierarchy and the Orthodox faith tried to thwart the activities of this Serbian archbishop in the Habsburg areas on several occasions during the war and post-war years, but they did not succeed, since Bishop Atanasije enjoyed a great reputation with the Orthodox clergy and people. After the death of Patriarch Arsenije III (1706), the bishop continued to advocate for the preservation of the church and national unity of all Orthodox Serbs in the Habsburg lands.

Although after the assembly the state authorities were asked to confirm the bishop's authority in the entire area of Gornja Krajina, Emperor Joseph I recognized his jurisdiction only in the areas of Zrinopolje, Lika and Krbava. This called into question the future survival of a single diocese. After the bishop's death (1712), at the church people's assembly held in 1713 in Sremski Karlovci, a decision was made to create a special diocese in the area of Gornja Krajina in addition to the diocese that included Zrinopolje, Lika and Krbava, which included the pre-war area. Karlovac General. Dionisije Ugarković was then elected as the bishop's successor in the first, Kostajnica diocese, and Danilo Ljubotina was elected as the successor in the second, Gornji Karlovac diocese.

It is assumed that the bishop died in the monastery of Komogovina, where he was probably buried. Due to a disagreement over the legacy, the Serbian patriarch Mojsije Rajović posthumously excommunicated Bishop Atanasij, but this decision was revoked and annulled by the patriarch himself shortly after (1714) since all disputed issues had been resolved in the meantime thanks to Krušedol Metropolitan Vikentije Popović-Hadžilavić.

Metropolitan Atanasija Ljubojević was one of the most deserving Serbian archbishops from the early modern period. The success of his pastoral ministry in various areas that were under Turkish, Venetian and Habsburg rule is a lasting testimony to the national unity of Orthodox Serbs on the Western sides of the renewed Serbian Patriarchate (1557-1766).

See also
 Metropolitanate of Dabar-Bosna

References

Bibliography

Citations

Serbian bishops
1635 births
1712 deaths